Recorder and Randsell is an anime television series by Seven based on the 4-panel manga series by Meme Higashiya. The story revolves around Atsushi Miyagawa, an elementary school student with the appearance of a full grown adult, and his older sister Atsumi, who conversely looks young despite being a high school student. The first two seasons, Do♪ and Re♪, aired on TV Saitama between January 5, 2012 and June 27, 2012 and was simulcast on Crunchyroll. The ending theme for the first season is "Glitter" by Aoi Tada feat. Sister 773 whilst the second season's ending theme is "Stare" by Paprika. A third season, Mi☆, began airing in July 2013.

Episode list

Season 1 (Do♪)

Season 2 (Re♪)

Season 3 (Mi☆)

References

Recorder and Randsell